The Big Gamble is a 1961 adventure film directed by Richard Fleischer. It stars Stephen Boyd and Juliette Gréco.

Plot
Vic Brennan is a sailor from Dublin who decides to use his family's fortune and move to Africa to open a truck-hauling business. He is accompanied by his wife, Marie, and a meek cousin, Samuel, who loses their documents, causing customs agents to seize some of their cargo.

As they proceed along the Ivory Coast, a plan occurs to Vic to purchase 300 cases of beer and deliver it to thirsty natives for sale. A German they encounter along the way, Kaltenberg, attempts to hijack it.

A feverish Samuel needs to be nursed back to health. He bravely dives into a raging river to save Vic from drowning. Their misfortune continues when the truck's brakes fail, causing it to race dangerously down a cliff road. Just as all seems lost, though, they safely reach their final destination.

Cast
 Stephen Boyd as Vic Brennan
 Juliette Gréco as Marie
 David Wayne as Samuel Brennan
 Gregory Ratoff as Kaltenberg 
 Sybil Thorndike as Aunt Cathleen 
 Fernand Ledoux as Customs Official 
 Marie Kean as Cynthia 
 Harold Goldblatt as The Priest 
 J. G. Devlin as The Driving Instructor
 Philip O'Flynn as John Brennan
 Fergal Stanley as Davey Brennan
 Jess Hahn as Ferguson
 Alain Saury as Lieutenant Francois
 Jacques Marin as Hotel Clerk

Reception
Bosley Crowther of The New York Times said the movie doesn't work "despite the vigor and desperation that the tireless director, Richard Fleischer, has got the actors to display. Once we have found that Gregory Ratoff, in the role of the drunken German guide, is a sneak in a comedy character's get-up, there is no more flavor or hope. Not even the volcanic Miss Greco can maintain her inner smoldering fire.
There's some good stuff early along, however. There's that wonderful trip through the surf from the side of an offshore freighter. And there's a delightful meeting along a jungle road with a band of gaily dressed natives who trade some heavy wood-chopping for some cases of beer."

References

External links
 
 
 
 

1961 films
1961 adventure films
20th Century Fox films
American adventure films
1960s English-language films
Films directed by Richard Fleischer
Films produced by Darryl F. Zanuck
Films with screenplays by Irwin Shaw
Trucker films
Films set in Dublin (city)
Films shot in Ireland
1960s American films